The 2009 Big 12 Conference baseball tournament was held at AT&T Bricktown Ballpark in Oklahoma City, Oklahoma, United States, from May 20 to May 24, 2009. This was the fourth year the conference used the round robin tournament setup. The winners of each group at the end of the round robin faced each other in a one-game match for the championship.  The Texas Longhorns defeated the Missouri Tigers, 12–7 to win the championship.

Regular Season Standings
Source:

Colorado and Iowa State did not sponsor baseball teams.

Tournament

Missouri advances due to tournament tiebreaker. 
Texas advances due to tournament tiebreaker.
Oklahoma State and Nebraska did not make the tournament.

All-Tournament Team

See also
College World Series
2009 College World Series
NCAA Division I Baseball Championship
2009 NCAA Division I baseball tournament
Big 12 Conference baseball tournament

References

2009 Big 12 Tournament

Tournament
Big 12 Conference Baseball Tournament
Big 12 Conference baseball tournament
Big 12 Conference baseball tournament
Baseball competitions in Oklahoma City
College sports tournaments in Oklahoma